Salix delnortensis is a species of willow known by the common name Del Norte willow.

Distribution
The plant is endemic to the Klamath Mountains of northwestern California and southwestern Oregon. It is named for Del Norte County, California, its primary distribution locale.

It is also endemic to serpentine soils.

Description
It forms thickets, sometimes quite large, some of which are made up of clones of one individual. The shrub has many branches, which are very brittle.

The young twigs are velvety or woolly with hairy coats; older branches are hairless. The leaves are oval, sometimes with pointed tips, smooth-edged, and woolly on the undersides. They grow to 10 centimeters long or more.

The inflorescences are produced before the leaves. Each is a catkin of flowers. Male catkins are about 3 centimeters long and thick, while female catkins vary in size.  Its bloom period is April and May.

References

External links

Calflora Database: Salix delnortensis (Del Norte willow)
Jepson Manual eFlora (TJM2) treatment of Salix delnortensis
UC CalPhotos gallery: Salix delnortensis

delnortensis
Flora of California
Flora of Oregon
Flora of the Klamath Mountains
Endemic flora of the United States
Natural history of Del Norte County, California
Flora without expected TNC conservation status